Wes-Del Community Schools Corporation is a school district in Gaston, Indiana, United States. It was formed in 1964.

References

School districts in Indiana
Education in Delaware County, Indiana
School districts established in 1964
1964 establishments in Indiana